Iván Andrés Morales Bravo (born 29 July 1999) is a Chilean professional footballer who currently plays for Liga MX club Cruz Azul.

Career

Club

International
He made his debut for the Chile national football team on 22 March 2019 in a friendly against Mexico, as a starter.

Goals for Chile

Honours
Colo-Colo
Primera División de Chile: 2017
Copa Chile: 2016, 2019, 2021

Cruz Azul
Supercopa de la Liga MX: 2022
Individual
Copa Chile top goalscorer: 2021

References

External links
 
 

1999 births
Living people
People from Linares Province
Chilean footballers
Chilean expatriate footballers
Chile under-20 international footballers
Chile international footballers
Colo-Colo footballers
Cruz Azul footballers
Chilean Primera División players
Liga MX players
Chilean expatriate sportspeople in Mexico
Expatriate footballers in Mexico
Association football forwards